This is a list of episodes from the fourth season of Impractical Jokers.

Episodes

References

External links 
 Official website
 

Impractical Jokers
2015 American television seasons